Ollerton is a village in the Borough of Cheshire East and the ceremonial county of Cheshire, England.

Local services are limited, and include a church in the adjacent village of Marthall, a pub and several postboxes. Other services such as the primary school, post office and shop have closed down, residents instead using services in Knutsford. Ollerton has a joint parish council with Marthall, elected every 3 years. The villages share the new village hall in Marthall, which was constructed in November 2009.

Ollerton is thought to have come from the name Owlerton and is named in the Domesday Book of 1086.

See also

Listed buildings in Ollerton, Cheshire

References

External links

Ollerton official website

Villages in Cheshire
Civil parishes in Cheshire